Prince Stefan may refer to:
Prince Stefan of Liechtenstein (born 1961), Liechtenstein's Ambassador to Germany
Prince Stefan (actor) (born 1989), Filipino actor